The molecular formula C32H43N5O5 (molar mass: 577.71 g/mol) may refer to:

 Dihydroergocryptine
 Epicriptine, or beta-dihydroergocryptine

Molecular formulas